If I Never Know You Like This Again is the third studio album by Northern Irish singer-songwriter Soak. It was released on 20 May 2022 on Rough Trade Records.

Critical reception

If I Never Know You Like This Again received generally favourable reviews from contemporary music critics. At Metacritic, which assigns a normalised rating out of 100 to reviews from mainstream critics, the album received an average score of 79, based on 5 reviews. 

Rolling Stone called the album "a personal, vivid and essential listen".

Track listing

Charts

References

2022 albums
SOAK albums
Rough Trade Records albums